Désiré Segbé Azankpo (born 6 May 1993) is a Beninese professional footballer who plays as a centre-forward for German club Bayern Munich II and the Benin national team.

Club career
Born in Allahé, Segbé Azankpo has played club football for Génération Foot, Metz B, Jeunesse Esch, Le Puy, Pagny-sur-Moselle, and Épinal.

Segbé Azankpo signed for Slovak club FK Senica in July 2018. He signed a one-year contract with English club Oldham Athletic on 23 July 2019, with the option of a further year. He was released by Oldham at the end of the 2019–20 season.

In October 2020, Segbé Azankpo signed for FC Villefranche in the French Championnat National.

On 22 June 2021, he signed a two-year contract with Dunkerque. He was loaned at Dinamo București, in Liga I, on 1 February 2022.

On 31 July 2022, Segbé Azankpo signed for German club Bayern Munich II, on a two-year contract.

International career
Segbé Azankpo made his international debut for Benin in 2014, and was part of the squad for the 2019 African cup of Nations.

References

1993 births
Living people
Association football forwards
Beninese footballers
Benin international footballers
Génération Foot players
FC Metz players
Jeunesse Esch players
Le Puy Foot 43 Auvergne players
SAS Épinal players
FK Senica players
Oldham Athletic A.F.C. players
FC Villefranche Beaujolais players
USL Dunkerque players
FC Dinamo București players
Luxembourg National Division players
Slovak Super Liga players
English Football League players
Championnat National players
Championnat National 2 players
Championnat National 3 players
Ligue 2 players
Beninese expatriate footballers
Beninese expatriate sportspeople in Senegal
Expatriate footballers in Senegal
Beninese expatriate sportspeople in France
Expatriate footballers in France
Beninese expatriate sportspeople in Luxembourg
Expatriate footballers in Luxembourg
Beninese expatriate sportspeople in Slovakia
Expatriate footballers in Slovakia
Beninese expatriate sportspeople in England
Expatriate footballers in England
Beninese expatriate sportspeople in Romania
Expatriate footballers in Romania
2019 Africa Cup of Nations players
FC Bayern Munich II players
Beninese expatriate sportspeople in Germany
Expatriate footballers in Germany